The 2015–16 Ugandan Super League is the 49th season of top-flight football in Uganda. Vipers are the defending champions having won their second championship last season. The campaign started on 22 August 2015.

Teams
Sixteen teams played the 2015/16 season. The top side will qualify for a qualification place in the 2017 CAF Champions League and the bottom three will be relegated to the Ugandan Big League.

Stadia and locations

League table

References

Ugandan Super League seasons
Uganda Super League
Super League